Ray Aranha (May 1, 1939 – October 9, 2011) was an American actor, playwright, and stage director.

Career
Born in Miami, Florida, Aranha appeared in and written numerous stage productions. In 1974, he won a Drama Desk Award for Outstanding New Playwright for My Sister, My Sister. Aranha  also wrote and toured in a one-man show, I Am Black, and later appeared as "Jim Bono" in Fences.

In addition to stage work, Aranha appeared in various film and television roles. In 1990, he co-starred in the short-lived ABC series Married People. After the series was canceled in 1991, he appeared in yet another short-lived series The Heights in 1992. Aranha has since had roles in Are You Afraid of the Dark?, New York Undercover, and Law & Order, and has roles in Dead Man Walking (1995), Deconstructing Harry (1997), and Maid in Manhattan (2002).

Death
On October 9, 2011, Aranha died at the age of 72 from a stroke.

Filmography

References

External links
 
 
 

1939 births
2011 deaths
Male actors from Miami
African-American male actors
African-American dramatists and playwrights
American theatre directors
Drama Desk Award winners
21st-century American male actors
20th-century American male actors
American male film actors
American male stage actors
American male television actors
20th-century American dramatists and playwrights
American male dramatists and playwrights
20th-century African-American writers
21st-century African-American people
20th-century American male writers
African-American male writers